Sivas Province is a province of Turkey. It is largely located at the eastern part of the Central Anatolia region of Turkey; it is the second largest province in Turkey by territory. Its adjacent provinces are Yozgat to the west, Kayseri to the southwest, Kahramanmaraş to the south, Malatya to the southeast, Erzincan to the east, Giresun to the northeast, and Ordu to the north. Its capital is Sivas.

Most of Sivas Province has the typical continental climate of the Central Anatolian Region, in which summer months are hot and dry, while winter months are cold and snowy. However, the northern part of the province shows some features of the oceanic/humid subtropical Black Sea climate, while the eastern portion has influences of the Eastern Anatolian highland climate.

This province is noted for its thermal springs.

Districts

Sivas province is divided into 17 districts (capital district in bold):

History 
The route of the Silk Road and the Persian Royal Road run through Sivas.

According to the written historical sources, the region of Sivas province was first inhabited during the period of the Hittite civilization by the beginning of 2000 BC and became an important settlement. The region then encountered the reign of Armenian, Roman, Byzantine, Seljukian,  and Ottoman civilizations.

The foundations of the modern Turkish Republic were laid in the Sivas Congress assembled on 4 September 1919, during the presidency of Mustafa Kemal Atatürk, thus making the province of Sivas important to the history of the Turkish nation.

Attractions
 Şifaiye Medrese
 Surp Asdvadzadzin Church of Tuzhisar, also known as the Armenian St. Virgin Mary Church
 Surp Kevork Church in Tavra
 Alakilise in Zara
 Surp Anapat
 Holy Forty Martyrs Church
 Surb Nshan Monastery
 Sızır Waterfall
 Lake Gökpınar

Economy

Historically, the province produced alum, copper, silver, iron, coal, asbestos, arsenic, and salt.

Gallery

References

External links
 Sivas Sanal Tur Sitesi
 Sivas Haber
 Sivas News - Sivas News
 Guide of Sivas City.